is a passenger railway station in the city of Shiroi, Chiba Prefecture, Japan, operated by the third-sector railway operator Hokusō Railway.

Lines

Station layout
This station consists of a single ground-level island platform serving two tracks, with the station building built above.

Platforms

Adjacent stations

History
Shiroi Station was opened on 9 March 1979. On 17 July 2010 a station numbering system was introduced to the Hokusō Line, with the station designated HS10.

Passenger statistics
In fiscal 2018, the station was used by an average of 9,048 passengers daily.

Surrounding area
 Shiroi City Hall
Shiroi Cultural Center
Shiroi Post Office

See also
 List of railway stations in Japan

References

External links

 Hokusō Line station information 

Railway stations in Japan opened in 1979
Railway stations in Chiba Prefecture
Hokusō Line
Shiroi